Venusia apicistrigaria is a moth in the family Geometridae first described by Alexander Michailovitsch Djakonov in 1936. It is found in China.

References

Moths described in 1936
Venusia (moth)